Georgetown is a city in Vermilion County, Illinois, United States.  As of the 2020 census, the city population was 3,143.  It is part of the Danville, Illinois Metropolitan Statistical Area.

History

Georgetown was established in 1826 and was platted by James Haworth with the length of a grapevine, although the first home was established in 1820 by Henry Johnson.  The town may have been named after George Beckwith, since Danville had been named after Dan Beckwith; another possibility is that it was named after James Haworth's son George.  The first post office was established in 1828.

The Paris and Danville Railroad was built in 1871, and the "Interurban" started carrying passengers between Georgetown and Danville sometime after 1900.

Geography

Demographics

As of the census of 2000, there were 3,628 people, 1,470 households, and 1,004 families residing in the city. The racial makeup of the city was 95.53% White, 2.73% African American, 0.28% Native American, 0.06% Asian, 0.25% from other races, and 1.16% from two or more races. Hispanic or Latino of any race were 1.19% of the population.

There were 1,470 households, out of which 34.4% had children under the age of 18 living with them, 49.9% were married couples living together, 14.2% had a female householder with no husband present, and 31.7% were non-families. 28.6% of all households were made up of individuals, and 16.2% had someone living alone who was 65 years of age or older. The average household size was 2.47 and the average family size was 3.00.

In the city, the population was spread out, with 27.9% under the age of 18, 8.2% from 18 to 24, 26.7% from 25 to 44, 21.1% from 45 to 64, and 16.0% who were 65 years of age or older. The median age was 36 years. For every 100 females, there were 90.1 males. For every 100 females age 18 and over, there were 83.1 males.

The median income for a household in the city was $33,852, and the median income for a family was $37,310. Males had a median income of $32,974 versus $22,581 for females. The per capita income for the city was $14,275. About 8.8% of families and 13.9% of the population were below the poverty line, including 21.6% of those under age 18 and 7.2% of those age 65 or over.

Education
 Georgetown Ridge Farm, High School located in Georgetown.
 Mary Miller Junior High, located in Georgetown.
 Pine Crest Elementary, located in Georgetown.
 Notre Dame de la Salette Boys Academy, traditionalist Catholic school administered by the Society of Saint Pius X.

References

External links

 City of Georgetown

Cities in Vermilion County, Illinois
Populated places established in 1826
1826 establishments in Illinois
Cities in Illinois